Cara Black and Rennae Stubbs were the defending champions and successfully defended their title, defeating Daniela Hantuchová and Ai Sugiyama 6–7(6–8), 7–6(7–4), 6–3 in the final.

Seeds

Draw

External links
 Main and qualifying draws

Doubles
Zurich Open